Forces Goal 2030 is a military modernization program of the Bangladesh Armed Forces which began in 2009 and revised in 2017, designed to the capabilities of the three services of the Bangladesh armed forces: the Army, the Navy and the Air Force. The primary focus of the modernization program is the reformation of the military organization, expansion of the forces, the transformation of the indigenous defense sector to support research and manufacturing, and acquisition of modern military weapons. The requirement for modernization was realized in the aftermath of 2008 Bangladesh–Myanmar naval standoff later resulting in Bangladesh's favour. One of the primary objectives of the modernization program is to develop a three-dimensional force (land, air and sea) capable of conducting multi-platform warfare.

To fulfil the modernization requirements, the Bangladesh Government allocates funds exclusively for the program in addition to the defense budget. The funds allocated for the program during the first five years is estimated to be around forty-thousand crores taka (US$5.2 billion). The program was revised in 2017, following the Rohingya refugee crisis, which facilitated a larger monetary allocation towards the modernization program.

Plans and developments

Army
The modernization program aims to transform Bangladesh Army into a technologically advanced, multi-domain force by 2030, capable of coordinating both defensive and offensive operations. Keeping up to reorganize the force, the army plans to establish three independent corps - Central, Eastern, and Western. To facilitate the establishment of three independent corps, steps have been taken to increase the overall size of the force. 17th infantry division was raised at Sylhet in 2013,  10th infantry division was raised at newly established Ramu Cantonment at Cox's Bazar in 2015 and 7th infantry division was raised at newly established Sheikh Hasina cantonment Barishal-Patuakhali in 2018. The establishment of three infantry divisions has raised the total number of the Army's infantry divisions to ten. In 2017, The Army began the establishment of a Riverine Engineer Battalion, which will be stationed at the newly constructed Mithamoine Cantonment at Kishorganj. Another full-fledged cantonment is being established at Ruma of Bandarban District. By 2021, The army will raise 97 new units. Of them, 19 units will be formed for the Jalalabad Cantonment in Sylhet, 22 units for Ramu Cantonment in Cox's Bazar , and 56 units for Sheikh Hasina cantonment in Barisal. A number of existing infantry battalions are being converted into para infantry battalions and mechanized infantry battalions for newly established and proposed cantonments. To increase special operation capabilities, the 2nd Para Commando Battalion has been raised, headquartered in Maulavibazar.

Under the modernization goal, several programs are being implemented to enhance the readiness of the force. Under such programs, approaches have been taken to modernize the regular infantry outfits. The new infantry outfits are equipped with Night Vision Goggles (NVG), Ballistic helmets, Eye protective gear, Bulletproof vest, person to person communicators, palmtop GPS device and BD-08 assault rifles with Collimator sight. To strengthen the mechanized infantry units, around 645 BTR-80, 44 Otokar Cobra I, 67 Otokar Cobra II  Armoured personnel carrier and 8 BOV M11 armoured reconnaissance vehicles have been procured. To enhance the anti-tank capabilities, Metis-M missile systems and PF-98 rocket systems. In April 2017, the army issued an evaluation notice for procurement of anti-tank guided weapon (ATGW). According to the specifications described in the notice, the minimum effective range of the missile have to be 4 km in day and 3 km in night or at poor visible condition. It's armor penetration behind ERA have to be not less than 800mm. The system can be operated with 2-3 crews and it will be a second generation or higher. Evaluation process of modern assault rifles and submachine guns is also going on.

The firepower of artillery units was increased by procuring 36 Nora B-52 K2 self-propelled artillery systems. Forty-nine WS-22 Guided Multiple Rocket Launcher Systems were also added so far. In 2021, army got delivery of 1 regiment TRG-300 Tiger MLRS system from Turkey. SLC-2 weapon locating radars were added to help the artillery firing. Procurement process of 155mm towed howitzer, 122 mm field artillery howitzers and 105mm towed field artillery systems is going on. Procurement of long range (120 to 280 km) multiple launch rocket system (MLRS) is also in the process. To support accurate artillery firing, Bangladesh Army has procured 36 Bramor C4EYE battlefield reconnaissance UAV from Slovenia in 2017. These UAVs have a maximum range of 40 kilometers and endurance of 3 hours. In October 2020, the Army published an evaluation notice for medium range UAV.

The Bangladesh Army procured 44 MBT-2000 tanks from China in 2011. Army engineers have completed the upgradation process of Type 69 tanks to Type 69IIG standard. Upgradation of 174 Type 59 tanks to Type 59G Durjoy standard is going on. Bangladesh Army has signed contract with China for 44 VT-5 light tanks in 2019. Army also started light amphibious tank procurement process in 2019.

Two regiments of FM 90C short range surface to air missile were added in 2016 to enhance air defence capabilities. In 2017, two Oerlikon GDF 009 anti aircraft gun systems have been procured with Skyguard fire control radar. In March 2018, a tender was floated for two local warning radars. The models shortlisted for the tender are Ground Master 200 of Thales, TRML-3D of Hensoldt and KRONOS Land of Leonardo. In the same month, another tender was issued for procuring 181 Man-portable air-defense systems. Here, Chinese FN-16, Russian Igla-S and Swedish RBS 70 systems has been shortlisted. In August 2020, the army has floated a tender for the procurement of medium range surface to air missile (MRSAM).

Modernizing the army aviation wing is in full swing. Two Eurocopter AS365 Dauphins were put into service in 2012. Six Mil Mi-171Sh helicopters were procured from Russia in 2016. One C-295 transport aircraft was bought from Spain. Army Aviation has plan to add one more EADS CASA C-295 transport aircraft and six more Mil Mi-171Sh helicopters to its fleet soon. They also have a plan to add attack helicopters to the fleet in the near future. In September 2020, the Army issued a tender notice to procure fixed-wing aircraft in financial year 2020–2021.

Tender was floated for procurement of a command ship in 2017. The vessel will be used as a floating command centre for different waterborne operations. Several tenders were floated to procure a total of six Landing craft tank for the army between 2017 and 2018. Bangladesh army issued tender for procuring two Troops Carrier Vessel (TCV) in January 2018. The vessels will be able to carry 200 personnel.

In a ceremony on 27 October 2021, Prime Minister discussed about the ongoing modernization plan of the Bangladesh Army and its upcoming equipment. She states that one regiment of 105 mm and 155 mm each artillery guns have been procured to increase the artillery power. She added that process of procuring one battery of Oerlikon GDF-009 was going on. Government had signed a contract to procure Very Short Range Air Defence (VSHORAD)system and two battery of radar controlled air defence guns. Government also procured six MALE UAV and tactical missile system for Bangladesh Army.

Navy
Due to the importance Bangladesh's vast maritime area of 118,813 square kilometers, high dependence of country's economy in maritime resources, and the geopolitical importance of Indian Ocean, Bangladesh Navy was given a significant importance in the modernization program. The programs aims to transform Bangladesh Navy into a modern, well-equipped three-dimensional force capable of conducting multi-domain operations. Under the program, the Navy have witnessed significant growth in firepower and weapon manufacturing capabilities. The expansion of Navy's surface fleet and force size is going on simultaneously. As of 2020, the navy acquired two submarines, eight frigates, six corvettes, eleven patrol vessel and a significant number of other surface combatants.

Under the modernization, indigenous shipyards have made significant strides in enhancing naval shipbuilding capabilities. There are three indigenous shipyards capable of developing large surface combatants for the navy: Khulna Shipyard Limited, Dockyard and Engineering Works Limited and Chittagong Dry Dock Limited, all fully-owned by the Bangladesh Navy. Khulna Shipyard has successfully launched the program of building eight Durjoy-class and twenty three Padma-class patrol craft. Chittagong Dry Dock Limited, ownership of which was transferred to the Navy in 2015, has been tasked with constructing six 2,000-tonnes Offshore patrol vessel and six multirole Guided Missile Frigate.

Alongside the development of Navy's water capabilities, Bangladesh Naval Aviation; the aviation wing of the Navy, have been established in 2011. Naval aviation added two Dornier 228NG aircraft from Germany and two AgustaWestland AW109 helicopter from Italy.

The Navy attained three-dimensional capabilities with the establishment of submarine fleet, with two Ming-class submarine acquired from People's Republic of China.

Bangladesh Navy is setting up a submarine base named BNS Sheikh Hasina, at Pekua in Cox's Bazar. The largest naval base of the country is under construction at Rabanabad in Patuakhali named BNS Sher-e-Bangla. The base will have submarine berthing and aviation facilities. A full-fledged operational base, named BNS Sheikh Mujib, has been constructed in Khilkhet of Dhaka. The construction works of a fleet headquarters at the Sandwip channel of Chattogram with ship berthing facilities is also going on. Navy has taken initiative to make missiles and IFF system in Bangladesh.

Air Force
Forces Goal 2030 plans to make the Bangladesh Air Force a technologically advanced, well-trained and well-equipped force that can deter any threat to the Bangladesh airspace. To efficiently perform the increasingly challenging duties and responsibilities, the air force is being divided into two separate commands: Southern air command and Northern air command. Two airbases has already been set up - BAF base Sheikh Hasina at Cox's Bazar and BAF base Bangabandhu at Dhaka. Two new air bases are under construction now, one at Barishal and another at Sylhet. A maritime air support operation center (MASOC) will be set up under southern command. The Air Force is on the process of setting up an advanced fighter pilot training unit named 105 Advance Jet Training Unit which will be consist of three training squadrons that will provide advanced trainings to the fighter pilots trainees.

In 2013, Bangladesh Air Force procured 16 Chengdu F-7BGI 3.5 generation fighter aircraft from China.

Bangladesh has signed a government to government contract with the United Kingdom for the supply of five off-the-shelf C-130J aircraft served with the Royal Air Force. All five aircraft have been delivered.

The Bangladesh Air Force procured twenty one Mil Mi-171Sh helicopters from Russia from 2010 to 2019 that can be used for both transport and attack roles. BAF also procured four AgustaWestland AW139 helicopters from Italy for maritime SAR operations. One Mil Mi-171E helicopter was purchased for VIP transport role.

BAF procured nine K-8 intermediate jet trainer to complement the fleet of seven L-39s. In 2015, BAF added three Let L-410 Turbolets into a newly formed squadron of Transport trainers. The Air Force also procured 16 Yakovlev Yak-130 Lead-in fighter trainer aircraft from Russia. Two AgustaWestland AW119 Koala helicopters have been procured to enhance helicopter training capabilities.

The Air Force bought JH-16, YLC-2, YLC-6 and JY-11B radar systems from China. A Selex RAT-31DL L Band AESA radar was procured from Italy. Besides, contract has been signed for procuring unknown number of Kronos Land radars. In 2011, BAF inducted its first surface-to-air missile system, the FM 90, from China. Till date, two regiments of this system have been procured.

In February 2017, BAF has floated a tender for the procurement of one battery of medium range surface to air missile (MRSAM) system consisting of one command vehicle, one search/target designation radar vehicle, one guidance radar vehicle and four missile firing vehicle. Each firing vehicle will have minimum four missiles. However as of April 2021, the Bangladesh Air Force has not provided any update about the procurement.

In December 2017, Bangladesh Air Force floated a tender for the procurement of one Unmanned combat aerial vehicle (UCAV). The system will consist of 3/4 Unmanned combat aerial vehicle (UCAV) and ground control station (GCS). The UAVs will have a range of 1000 km and an endurance of 15 hours without weapon load and nine hours with weapon load. They will have 2/4 hardpoints with minimum payload requirement of 120 kg. 

In October 2019, the Bangladesh Air Force was offered two types of attack helicopters and BAF selected the Boeing AH-64 Apache, pending government approval. In January 2020, Boeing confirmed that its AH-64E has been down-selected for a potential program in Bangladesh. However the purchase of AH-64 Apache helicopters is still stuck because Bangladesh has not yet signed the Acquisition and Cross-Servicing Agreement (ACSA) and General Security of Military Information Agreement (GSOMIA) agreements with the United States yet.

In January 2020, the minister responsible for defense affairs in the parliament, Mr. Anisul Huq told the parliament that process is going on to procure 16 multirole combat aircraft, eight attack helicopters, three VVIP helicopters, two air defence radar units, 24 primary trainer aircraft, two light aircraft, one K-8W simulator, four MRAP vehicles, one AW-119 simulator, 2 counter drone surveillance radar system and one mobile ATC tower and life extension and upgradation of Mig-29 aircraft.

In October 2020,  the air force received 7 more K-8W jet trainers.

In January 2021, the air force floated a tender for the procurement of Kh-31A medium-range air-to-surface missile for MiG-29B aircraft.

In 2021, Bangladesh Air Force requested Bangladesh Government to earmark around 25,200-crores taka  (2.5 billion euro) for 16 western-origin multirole fighter jet. In order to sign the agreement and for the first installment council, Bangladesh Air Force has requested for allocation of  6,300-crores taka from the coming 2021-22 financial year. In 2021, Eurofighter World  Magazine already stated Bangladesh as a potential customer for Eurofighter Typhoon. Considering the allocation of funds, it can be assumed that Bangladesh is interested in buying the latest Captor-E AESA radar equipped Tranche 4 or Tranche 3A variant of Eurofighter Typhoon. Germany already ordered 38 Trance 4s  as a launch customer with cost of 5.4 billion euro in late 2020. According to Dirk Hoke, CEO Airbus Defense and Space, "The new Tranche 4 Eurofighter is currently the most modern European-built combat aircraft with a service life well beyond 2060." Along with Eurofighter Typhoon, other possible candidate is Dassault Rafale. Plans and procedures for the procurement of 16 western-origin multirole fighter jet were established after cancellation of the older tender for 8 to 12 Russian made MRCA. 

In June 2021, Bangladesh Air Force has ordered 24 Grob G 120TP trainer aircraft. According to Masihuzzaman Serniabat, previous COAS, Bangladesh Air Force has ordered 24 trainer aircraft from Grob along with offset. Under the deal, Grob Aircraft will also  install  a composite material ( fiberglass reinforced plastic and carbon fibre composites) repair workshop and a propeller repair workshop in Bangladesh.

Miscellaneous
On 29 June 2021, Government to Government (G2G) defense memorandum of understanding (MoU) signed between  Bangladesh and Turkey. According to Dr. İsmail Demir, president of Presidency of Defense Industries, the export agreement of various products of Roketsan has been signed with Bangladesh. Roketsan already delivered TRG-300 Tiger MLRS to the Bangladesh Army in June 2021 from a separate deal. Bangladesh is set to become one of the top defense equipment clients of Turkey in next few years.

Procurements and Upgrades

Army

Navy

Air Force

Structural and organizational developments

Military budget

Bangladesh military budget increased with expansion of total budget.

Indigenous defence industry

Bangladesh Machine Tools Factory

 Upgradation of 174 Type 59 tanks to Type 59G Durjoy standard
 Assembling Arunima Baliyaan trucks

Bangladesh Ordnance Factories
 Making and developing BD-08 Assault Rifle and BD-15 LMG 
 Making 82mm and 60mm mortars.
 Making artillery shells of different calibers including more modern production line for 105 mm and new production line for 155 mm artillery shells with Free Flowforming technology and computerized machinery from Turkish company REPKON.
 Making Arges 84 BD Grenades.

Khulna Shipyard
 Making Padma-class patrol vessel
 Building ASW capable Durjoy-class patrol crafts
 Building survey vessels

Chattogram Dry Dock Limited
 Construction of six 2000 ton Offshore Patrol Vessel (OPV).
 Construction of six frigates in collaboration with a foreign partner

Dockyard and Engineering Works Limited
 Making X12 High speed patrol boat

See also
 Coast Guard Goal 2030
 Equipment of the Bangladesh Army
 List of active aircraft of the Bangladesh Air Force
 List of active ships of the Bangladesh Navy
 List of active Bangladesh military aircraft

References

External links
 Official Website of Bangladesh Army 
 Official Website of Bangladesh Air Force
 Bangladesh Navy

Bangladesh Navy
Military acquisition
Military history of Bangladesh
Military of Bangladesh
Military reforms